Khryplyn is a village in Ivano-Frankivsk Raion located in the Ivano-Frankivsk Oblast, Ukraine. It was first mentioned in 1436. Khryplyn belongs to Ivano-Frankivsk urban hromada, one of the hromadas of Ukraine. 

The village is located right next to the city of Ivano-Frankivsk across the Bystrytsia-Nadvirnyanska River that makes a natural border of the village to the west and northwest. The village also sits next to another suburb of Mykytyntsi, bordering which by a railroad and the State companies of Avtolyvmash and Presmash (former Karpatpresmash) to the northeast. The railroad also makes the eastern border of the village as well. To the south of Khryplyn is located the village of Cherniiv.

The whole village consists of the original settlement that stretches along its main street, Avtolyvmash Street, and a cottage settlement that is located to the west, closer to the banks of Bystrytsia river. The two settlements are divided by the Bystrytsia's tributary Mlynivka.

The former mayor of Ivano-Frankivsk Zinoviy Shkutiak was looking for greenfield investments for the Kryplyn Industrial Zone.

Until 18 July 2020, Khryplyn belonged to Ivano-Frankivsk Municipality. The municipality was abolished in July 2020 as part of the administrative reform of Ukraine, which reduced the number of raions of Ivano-Frankivsk Oblast to six. The area of Ivano-Frankivsk Municipality was merged into Ivano-Frankivsk Raion.

Khryplyn Industrial-Investment Zone
Khryplyn Industrial-Investment Zone:
 Ukrainian Appliances
 "Electrolux" laundry washing machine
 Tyco Electronics Ukraine
 Pressmash, former state company
 Hyrych, a plastic recycling company
 Construction materials, a producing complex for brick production

Transportation
 Khryplyn railways station is an important railway station of Ivano-Frankivsk. Traveling from Ivano-Frankivsk, trains diverge either towards Kolomyia and further towards Chernivtsi or towards Nadvirna and further to the border with Romania.

Notable residents
Yaroslav Hretchuk (1955 – 2010), a Distinguished Journalist of Ukraine, who lived and died in the village.

References

External links
 Official website of Verkhovna Rada , for the explanation on administrative division no English version is available on the website.
 Profile of Karpatpresmash/Presmash 

Villages in Ivano-Frankivsk Raion